The Mind's Eye series consists of several art films rendered using computer-generated imagery of varying levels of sophistication, with original music scored note-to-frame. The series was conceived by Steven Churchill of Odyssey Productions in 1990. The initial video was directed, conceptualized, edited and co-produced by Jan Nickman of Miramar Productions and produced by Churchill. The first three products in the series were released on VHS (by BMG) and LaserDisc (by Image Entertainment) and also released on DVD (by Simitar Entertainment). The fourth program in the series was released and distributed by Sony Music on DVD.

Overview
The typical entry in the Mind's Eye series is a short package film, usually 50 to 60 minutes long, with an electronic music soundtrack over a series of music video-like sequences. The original film, titled The Mind's Eye: A Computer Animation Odyssey, by director and co-producer Jan Nickman and producer Steven Churchill, consisted of a non-rigid structure of many semi-related sequences. The general style which characterizes the series is light and cartoonish, due to the difficulty of rendering more complicated images using the computers of the day.

The computer animation sequences that appeared in the films were generally not produced specifically for the Mind's Eye series but rather were work originally created for other purposes, including demo reels, commercials, music videos, and feature films. Nickman then assembled these sequences into a narrative through creative editing, which resulted in a double platinum selling film considered to be a milestone in the field of computer animation. As a result, The Mind's Eye: A Computer Animation Odyssey reached No. 12 on Billboard'''s video hits chart. This approach gave Churchill access to the best-quality computer graphics of the time without having to bear their substantial production costs.

The soundtracks for the films were composed by James Reynolds, Jan Hammer, Thomas Dolby and Kerry Livgren (founder and guitarist for Kansas).

Films

Spin-off titles and other releases

Two other anthologies released by Churchill did not include the term "The Mind's Eye" as part of their titles and are thus not considered to be part of the series.

Churchill's most recent releases have been entries in the eight part Computer Animation series.

A second sister series obliquely referencing Computer Animation is formed by the original Mind's Eye video and Cyberscape: A Computer Animation Vision (August 28, 1997, co-produced by Zoe Productions and Odyssey Productions), a surreal animation chronicling the evolution of human life and thought, by Beny Tchaicovsky.

Reception and adaptationsBeyond the Mind's Eye was a bestseller in the US when it was originally released on VHS and LaserDisc. Roger Ebert selected it as his "Video Pick of the Week" for the week of December 23, 1992 on the TV series Siskel & Ebert.

Several excerpts from The Mind's Eye were seen in the 1992 sci-fi horror film The Lawnmower Man, which itself was featured in Beyond the Mind's Eye. The Mind's Eye and Beyond the Mind's Eye were both integral components in YTV's Short Circutz segments that aired between programs in the 1990s. Canadian independent television station NTV airs excerpts from the first three Mind's Eye videos as part of their "Computer Animated Art Festivals" that run overnight on Fridays.

Pantera covered the song "Planet Caravan", originally by Black Sabbath, on their 1994 album Far Beyond Driven. The music video for this song features scenes from Beyond the Mind's Eye''.

References

External links
The Mind's Eye

Beyond the Mind's Eye

The Gate to the Mind's Eye

Odyssey Into the Mind's Eye

Luminous Visions

Ancient Alien

Virtual Nature

Computer-animated films
Animated anthology films